How Far Is Tattoo Far? is an American reality television series hosted by Nicole Polizzi (Justina Valentine was added on as a host during the second season for Polizzi's maternity leave) and Nico Tortorella that premiered October 11, 2018 on MTV. It is the US version of the UK series Just Tattoo of Us. Each episode features pairs of friends or family who have each designed a tattoo for the other. The tattoo isn't revealed to the recipient until the end of the show, keeping them and the viewer in suspense.

Casting
Season 1 featured Nilsa Prowant and Aimee Hall from Floribama Shore, Angelina Pivarnick from Jersey Shore with her then-fiancee Chris Larangeira, Cara Maria Sorbello and Paulie Calafiore from The Challenge, and Soju from RuPaul's Drag Race.

Season 2 featured Cheyenne Floyd and Cory Wharton from Teen Mom OG, Codi Butts and Kirk Medas from Floribama Shore, Zach Holmes and Chad Tepper from Too Stupid to Die, Tony Raines and Alyssa Giacone from Real World: Skeletons, and Kailah Casillas from Real World: Go Big or Go Home along with Mikey P from From G's to Gents.

Episodes

Series overview

Season 1 (2018)

Season 2 (2019)

References

2010s American reality television series
2018 American television series debuts
MTV original programming
Tattooing television series
2019 American television series endings
American television series based on British television series